Nepenthes burkei, named after British plant collector David Burke,  is a tropical pitcher plant native to the island of Mindoro in the Philippines, where it grows at an elevation of 1100–2000 m. It is very closely related to N. sibuyanensis and N. ventricosa. It has only recently entered wider cultivation.

Infraspecific taxa

Two varieties of N. burkei have been described.

Nepenthes burkei var. excellens Hort.Veitch ex Marshall (1890)
Nepenthes burkei var. prolifica Mast. (1890)

Natural hybrids
N. alata × N. burkei

References

Further reading

 [Anonymous] 1889. Nepenthes at Messrs. Veitch's. The Gardeners' Chronicle, series 3, 6(145): 388.
 [Anonymous] 1889. Nepenthes Burkeii. The Gardeners' Chronicle, series 3, 6(151): 566.
 Bauer, U., C.J. Clemente, T. Renner & W. Federle 2012. Form follows function: morphological diversification and alternative trapping strategies in carnivorous Nepenthes pitcher plants. Journal of Evolutionary Biology 25(1): 90–102. 
 Co, L. & W. Suarez 2012. Nepenthaceae. Co's Digital Flora of the Philippines.
  Jarry-Desloges, R. 1903. Variétés nouvelles ou rares de Nepenthes. Le Jardin 17: 72.
 Kurata, S. 1968. Mindoro/North Borneo Expedition. Part 1&2. The Journal of Insectivorous Plant Society No. 45.
 Kurata, S. & M. Toyoshima 1972. Philippine species of Nepenthes. The Gardens' Bulletin Singapore 26(1): 155–158. Abstract
 Macfarlane, J.M. 1927. The Philippine species of Nepenthes. The Philippine Journal of Science 33(2): 127–140.
 McPherson, S.R. & V.B. Amoroso 2011. Field Guide to the Pitcher Plants of the Philippines. Redfern Natural History Productions, Poole.
  McPherson, S. & T. Gronemeyer 2008. Die Nepenthesarten der Philippinen: eine Fotodokumentation. Das Taublatt 60: 34–78.
  Meimberg, H. 2002. Molekular-systematische Untersuchungen an den Familien Nepenthaceae und Ancistrocladaceae sowie verwandter Taxa aus der Unterklasse Caryophyllidae s. l.. Ph.D. thesis, Ludwig Maximilian University of Munich, Munich. 
 Meimberg, H. & G. Heubl 2006. Introduction of a nuclear marker for phylogenetic analysis of Nepenthaceae. Plant Biology 8(6): 831–840.

External links

Photographs of N. burkei at the Carnivorous Plant Photofinder

burkei
Endemic flora of the Philippines
Carnivorous plants of Asia
Plants described in 1889